Atsumi is both a unisex Japanese given name and a Japanese surname.

Possible writings
Atsumi can be written using many different combinations of kanji characters. Here are some examples: 

渥美, "kindness/moisten, beauty"
渥実, "kindness/moisten, fruit/reality"
渥巳, "kindness/moisten, sign of the snake (Chinese zodiac)"
淳美, "honest, beauty"
淳実, "honest, fruit/reality"
淳巳, "honest, sign of the snake (Chinese zodiac)"
淳三, "honest, three"
厚美, "thick, beauty"
厚実, "thick, fruit/reality"
厚巳, "thick, sign of the snake (Chinese zodiac)"
敦美, "kindliness, beauty"
敦実, "kindliness, fruit/reality"
敦巳, "kindliness, sign of the snake (Chinese zodiac)"
惇美, "kind, beauty"
惇実, "kind, fruit/reality"
篤美, "sincere, beauty"
篤巳, "sincere, sign of the snake (Chinese zodiac)"
篤三, "sincere, three"

The name can also be written in hiragana あつみ or katakana アツミ.

Notable people with the given name Atsumi
, Japanese rower
, Japanese voice actress

Notable people with the surname Atsumi
Jiro Atsumi (渥美 二郎), real name Toshio Atsumi (渥美 敏夫, born 1952), Japanese male singer
, Japanese actor
Saiki Atsumi, Japanese singer and member of Band-Maid
, Japanese singer

Japanese-language surnames
Japanese feminine given names